17th Parallel, Nights and Days is a 1973 Vietnamese drama film directed by Hai Ninh. It was entered into the 8th Moscow International Film Festival where Tra Giang won the award for Best Actress.

Cast
 Mang Long Dao
 Ba Loc Duong
 Doan Duong
 Toi Lam
 Ho Thai
 Tra Giang

References

External links
 

1973 films
1970s historical drama films
Vietnamese-language films
Vietnamese historical drama films
1973 drama films